Grey James Grove (16821742) of Pool Hall, Alveley, Shropshire, was a British Whig politician who sat in the House of Commons in two parliaments between 1715 and 1741.
 
Grove was baptized on  10 November 1682, the eldest son  of James Grove of Alveley, serjeant-at-law, and his wife  Anne Grey, daughter  of Thomas Grey, Lord Grey of Groby MP.  He married Penelope Jermyn, daughter of Thomas Jermyn, 2nd Baron Jermyn MP.
 
At the 1715 British general election, Grey was returned as Member of Parliament for Bewdley  on the interest of  Lord Herbert of Chirbury. He voted with the Administration except on the Peerage Bill, when he abstained. He did not stand at the 1722 British general election and was out of parliament for over ten years. He was High Sheriff of Shropshire from 1730 to 1731 and succeeded his father in  1734. He stood again at the 1734 British general election when he was elected in a contest at Bridgnorth on the Whitmore interest. He voted for the Spanish convention in 1739 and abstained  on the place bill in 1740. He did not stand at the 1741 British general election. 
 
Grove died in April 1742, leaving two sons.

References

1682 births
1742 deaths
Members of the Parliament of Great Britain for English constituencies
British MPs 1715–1722
British MPs 1734–1741